Toxin is a fictional character appearing in American comic books published by Marvel Comics. He has been depicted as a superhero and at times a supervillain. The character is the offspring of Carnage, the third major symbiote in the Marvel Universe, the ninth known to have appeared in the comics outside of the Planet of the Symbiotes storyline, and the first symbiote that Spider-Man considers an ally, despite several temporary alliances with Venom in the past. The Toxin symbiote's various hosts are former NYPD police officer Patrick Mulligan, Eddie Brock, and teenager Bren Waters.

Stephen Graham portrayed Detective Mulligan in the Sony's Spider-Man Universe film Venom: Let There Be Carnage.

Fictional character biography
Carnage produced an offspring: a third symbiote. Carnage felt only dislike and hatred towards this new spawn, even before giving "birth" to it, both fearing that it could become much stronger, and being generally disgusted at the thought of giving birth. At the same time, Venom became aware that Carnage was "pregnant" and sought out Carnage to talk about this new symbiote. Carnage had resolved to kill this spawn as soon as it was born. Venom was doing the best to protect the new symbiote, with the intention of raising it to become a new partner. Venom was also concerned that, as the 1,000th symbiote of their line, the new symbiote could potentially become psychotic and violent because of genetic breakdown.

Patrick Mulligan
Patrick Mulligan was one of New York City's finest cops, yet troubled with various personal problems. His stressful job, along with the strain of his new family (his wife Gina was pregnant with their first son Edward) were taking their toll. One night while on duty, he came across the site where Carnage was giving birth to the new symbiote. Carnage, needing a host to hide the symbiote to keep it from Venom, bonded it to Mulligan. Carnage resolved to kill both Mulligan and the symbiote since they were not yet strong enough to manifest a super-powered costume like the Venom and Carnage symbiotes. Venom still hoped to use this new symbiote as a partner, and fought Carnage to a standstill to protect Mulligan and the symbiote, whom he christened Toxin, after himself. At first, Mulligan did not realize what had happened to him. Before long, the Toxin symbiote had matured enough to gain both conscious thought and the strength to form a symbiote costume on Mulligan's body. After Carnage attacked Gina and Edward at their home, Mulligan realized the Toxin symbiote was a danger to both himself and his family. During a subsequent confrontation between Venom, Carnage, and Toxin, Venom realized Mulligan was dedicated to a life of virtue, or as close as he could come under the symbiote's influence. When it became clear that Toxin was easily as strong as either of his predecessors, and was still growing, Venom and Carnage formed a temporary pact to destroy Toxin. Spider-Man stumbled into the final confrontation among the symbiote trio, and helped Toxin. After they fended off Venom and Carnage, Toxin had a conversation with Spider-Man, filling the latter in on what had happened. Spider-Man encouraged him, and Toxin resigned himself to a life of battling his base symbiote urges while trying to harness his power for good. He left his wife and child, and the police force, to try to come to terms with his new life.

In 2005, after Spider-Man joined the New Avengers, Marvel introduced a six-issue Toxin limited series, which followed Toxin's battles with various supervillains escaped from the Raft as a result of events at the beginning of The New Avengers series. The series also portrayed Mulligan's constant battle to keep the Toxin symbiote under control; as the host and symbiote minds had conversations and arguments with each other. Throughout the miniseries, he battled King Cobra, the Wrecker, Piledriver, and Razor Fist. At one point, trying to live with the Toxin symbiote became too much for Mulligan, who attempted suicide by throwing himself in front of a train. The Toxin symbiote intervened at the last moment, saving Mulligan and claiming that Mulligan did not really want to die. When Mulligan pressed the issue, it became clear that, unlike the Venom and Carnage symbiotes, Toxin is not sure it could survive on its own and find a new host. In the limited series, Razor Fist murdered Mulligan's father, but Toxin begins to show signs of a heroic behavior; he tracked Razor Fist down, but rather than slaughtering (as both the Toxin symbiote and Razor Fist himself urge), Toxin controls himself and turns Razor Fist over to the police. Mulligan reconciled with Gina by 'introducing' his estranged wife to the Toxin symbiote as a way of explaining why he walked out on his family. Mulligan and the Toxin symbiote co-operate peacefully with an agreement: Mulligan will be in complete control, if he allows Toxin two hours of "playtime" each night. But in those two hours, Toxin is not allowed to commit any acts of grand theft, arson, or homicide.

Mulligan is killed by Blackheart, resulting in the Toxin symbiote appearing in an underground lab in Las Vegas.

Eddie Brock

Afterwards, the Crime Master's underling Jack O'Lantern blackmails Venom into retrieving the Toxin symbiote. A fight with security personnel results in Jack O'Lantern taking the Toxin symbiote and fleeing. Blackheart is revealed to have bound pieces of the Toxin symbiote to clones of X-23, and also retained a small sample of the Toxin symbiote in a test tube because of needing an "alien's flesh" as an ingredient in a ritual to bring hell to Earth.

Along with Venom, Anti-Venom, Hybrid and his sister Scorn, Toxin is mentioned as being the next option to stop Carnage's rampage in the Midwest after the Avengers are defeated. However, the US military is unable to find Toxin, leaving it up to the hybrid symbiotes and Scorn to stop Carnage.

After killing Hybrid and Scream, Eddie Brock follows Venom into Crime Master's headquarters as part of his plan to destroy all symbiotes. During the ensuing fight between Venom and Crime Master's underlings, Crime Master locks Brock up and forcibly bonds him to the Toxin symbiote, making him the new Toxin. Brock joins the Savage Six to fight Venom, but is severely burned in the fight.

Eddie and the Toxin symbiote eventually track down Venom and discover a group of creatures called the "symbiote slayers" that are determined to destroy the symbiotes. Venom and Toxin have to team up to fight the "slayers". After this, Toxin agrees to leave Venom alone, and Brock as Toxin reclaims his title as the "lethal protector".

Brock and the Toxin symbiote appear once more in the All-New, All-Different Marvel miniseries Carnage, where Brock serves in a task force led by John Jameson, in hopes to entrap Carnage who was hidden in a mine-shaft. Toxin is considered "Plan B" to the force, and Brock's transformation into Toxin is manually controlled through a button. The Toxin symbiote's look has changed into resembling Agent Venom's, in which he sports red body armor. But at the end, Brock loses the suit.

Carnage has taken hold of the book known as the Darkhold, to resurrect Chthon, Eddie Brock ultimately sacrifices the Toxin symbiote in the final issue against Chthon.

Bren Waters
Toxin returns during the King in Black tie-in miniseries Planet of the Symbiotes. Toxin has now bonded with a new host, teenager Bren Waters, the son of the new Guardsman (Ozkar Waters); the two have a brief scuffle.

Powers and abilities
The Toxin symbiote possessed the special abilities of his two symbiote predecessors: he can stick to walls (which originally came from when Spider-Man was a host of the Venom symbiote), can change his identity to that of a completely different person, and also has unlimited webbing. With Patrick Mulligan as the host, Toxin is red from the abdomen up and black from the abdomen down. With Eddie Brock as the host, Toxin resembles a combination of Venom and Carnage but with the entire body red—light on the chest, and dark on the arms and lower body.<ref>{{Cite book|title=Venom #31|last=Bunn|first=Cullen|publisher=Marvel|year=2011}}</ref> Toxin can also blend in with his surroundings and become undetectable, an ability he gained from his grandfather Venom, and he can form solid weapons from his limbs, an ability first seen in his father Carnage. Toxin also seems to have some sort of quick-healing ability like his predecessors, as his wounds from his first battle with Razor Fist healed remarkably quickly. Unlike the others, Toxin can track anyone—not just other symbiotes or symbiote host—within the entire city of New York and possibly farther, as long as he has something to begin from.

Unlike many of the other symbiotes, Toxin did not try to take over the mind of his human host. Instead, the Toxin symbiote actually thinks and voices its opinions to the human host (as evidenced in Toxin's "Cut to the Chase" storyline). The Toxin symbiote usually speaks when the host is in his "human form", and acts very immature and childlike because of its nascent existence, once refusing to aid Pat in battle until he apologized for an earlier argument. In addition, he seems to have a stronger resistance to sonics and intense heat compared to Carnage, though this does not mean that Toxin is more resistant to violent urges: it can get carried away with violence and fighting crime, even if it is a petty crime. When he is not angry or fighting, Toxin is slim and smooth-lined, although still well muscled, closely resembling Carnage or Spider-Man's symbiote costume. When he becomes upset or aggressive, he grows into his much bigger and stronger form like Venom, with vicious fangs and long curving claws. The Toxin symbiote recently developed a venomous bite after bonding to Eddie.

In other media
Film
Patrick Mulligan appears in Venom: Let There Be Carnage, portrayed by Stephen Graham. This version is a San Francisco Police Department detective who wears a hearing aid due to a past encounter with Frances Barrison while working as an officer. In the present, he attempts to use Eddie Brock to investigate Cletus Kasady, but gets caught in a battle between the Venom and Carnage symbiotes and Barrison. During the fight, Mulligan is apparently killed by Barrison, but absorbs a piece of one of the symbiotes, which later revives him and causes his eyes to glow blue.

Video games
 The Patrick Mulligan incarnation of Toxin appears in Marvel: War of Heroes.
 The Eddie Brock incarnation of Toxin appears as an alternate skin for Eddie Brock / Venom in Marvel Heroes.
 The Toxin symbiote, renamed Carnom, appears as a playable character and boss in Lego Marvel Super Heroes 2. This version is the result of the Green Goblin 2099 using a shard of the Nexus of All Realities to fuse the Venom and Carnage symbiotes. Carnom is initially controlled by the Goblin, but he is defeated and freed by the heroes and starts chasing the Goblin in retaliation for his abuse.
 The Patrick Mulligan and Eddie Brock incarnations of Toxin appear as playable characters in Spider-Man Unlimited.
 The Bren Waters incarnation of Toxin appears as a playable character in Marvel: Future Fight''.

Merchandise
 The Patrick Mulligan and Eddie Brock incarnations of Toxin received figures in the Spider-Man Classics line.
 The Patrick Mulligan incarnation of Toxin received a figure in the Marvel Heroclix line via the "Web of Spider-Man" sub-line.
 The head and arm of the Toxin symbiote, packed with an Ultron figure, appear in Hasbro's "Marvel Mashers" line of figures.
 The Patrick Mulligan incarnation of Toxin received a Marvel Fan Channel exclusive Marvel Legends figure.
 Several accessories of Toxin have been produced, including a T-shirt.
 Blankets and hats have also been produced, displaying the Patrick Mulligan incarnation of Toxin, but were mistakenly labelled as Carnage.

Collected editions

References

External links
 
 Toxin's profile at Spiderfan.org
 
 Toxin's comics at TheVenomSite.com

Characters created by Peter Milligan
Comics characters introduced in 2004
Fictional amorphous creatures
Fictional characters from New York City
Fictional parasites and parasitoids
Marvel Comics aliens
Marvel Comics characters who are shapeshifters
Marvel Comics characters who can move at superhuman speeds
Marvel Comics characters with accelerated healing
Marvel Comics characters with superhuman strength
Marvel Comics extraterrestrial superheroes
Marvel Comics male superheroes
Marvel Comics male supervillains
Marvel Comics police officers
Merged fictional characters
Vigilante characters in comics
Articles about multiple fictional characters